A shift invariant system is the discrete equivalent of a time-invariant system, defined such that if  is the response of the system to , then  is the response of the system to . That is, in a shift-invariant system the contemporaneous  response of the output variable to a given value of the input variable does not depend on when the input occurs; time shifts are irrelevant in this regard.

Applications
Because digital systems need not be causal, some operations can be implemented in the digital domain that cannot be implemented using discrete analog components. Digital filters that require finite numbers of future values can be implemented while the analog counterparts cannot.

Notes

References
 Oppenheim, Schafer, Digital Signal Processing, Prentice Hall, 1975,

See also
 LTI system theory

Control theory